Premin (Macedonian Cyrillic: Премин) is a religious internet portal from North Macedonia established on September 29, 2005. Editor of the Portal is Metropolitan Naum of Strumica.

See also

 Macedonian Orthodox Church

References

Mass media companies of North Macedonia
Telecommunications in North Macedonia
Macedonian Orthodox Church